Pierre Lynn de Lappe (October 5, 1935 – March 21, 2016), also known as Peter Brown, was an American actor. He portrayed Deputy Johnny McKay opposite John Russell as Marshal Dan Troop in the 1958 to 1962 ABC-Warner Brothers western television series Lawman and Texas Ranger Chad Cooper on NBC's Laredo from 1965 to 1967.

Early life
During his United States Army service in Alaska with the 2nd Infantry Division, Brown became involved in writing, directing and acting in plays to entertain the other troops. Upon his discharge, Brown studied Drama at the University of California, Los Angeles and soon was appearing in plays and on NBC Matinee Theatre. 

He supported himself by working in a gasoline station on the Sunset Strip. One night a man paid for his purchase with a credit card reading "Jack L. Warner". Brown asked the customer whether he was one of the Warner Brothers, the man replied "I'm the last one left".

Career
As a contract player for Warner Brothers, Brown appeared in the theatrical film Darby's Rangers (1958) with James Garner and Stuart Whitman. He also appeared in the 1962 films Merrill's Marauders, which was co-written and directed by Samuel Fuller starring Jeff Chandler, and Red Nightmare with Jack Kelly.

Lawman
Though his role in Onionhead was cut from the completed film, the producer Julius Schermer hired him for Deputy Johnny McKay in Lawman, an important part secondary to John Russell as Marshal Dan Troop, that lasted from 1958 to 1962. Brown was the last surviving member of the series.

Maverick
Brown appeared in dozens of other television shows and did several crossovers with other western series as Johnny McKay, including Maverick, in the 1961 episode "Hadley's Hunters". He also appeared on Maverick playing different characters in the 1957 episode "Point Blank" (as Clay Semple) and "Stage West", playing a villain named Rip Fallon.

Cheyenne
In 1957 Brown appeared as Clay Conover in Cheyenne in the episode "Top Hand." In 1958 he appeared as Billy Younger in Cheyenne in the episode "Ghost of the Cimarron." In the Cheyenne episode "Renegades" (1958), Brown portrayed Jed Wayne.

Colt .45
Brown twice guest-starred in another ABC/WB western, Colt .45, with Wayde Preston. He appeared as Dave in "The Peacemaker" or "Judgment Day", the series premiere in 1957. That same season, he was cast as Jimmy Benedict in the episode "Young Gun".

Post-Warner Bros.
After his contract with Warner Brothers lapsed, Brown made two films for Walt Disney Studios, including Summer Magic with Hayley Mills and Burl Ives. He appeared in other television series too, such as Redigo, starring Richard Egan as a New Mexico rancher. He contracted to Universal Pictures for the 1965 NBC Western television series Laredo, set on the Mexican border in and about Laredo, Texas.

Brown appeared in the pilot for Police Woman, starring Angie Dickinson. Brown appeared in several exploitation films such as Foxy Brown, Chrome and Hot Leather, and Act of Vengeance.

Soap operas 
Brown also appeared on several soap operas. On Days of Our Lives, he played Dr. Greg Peters from 1972-1979 who was involved in a romance with Amanda Howard (Mary Frann). He was Laurie Brooks' attorney, Robert Laurence, on The Young and the Restless (1981-1982) when she was on trial for the murder of her former mother-in-law, Vanessa Prentiss. He would return briefly to "Y&R" in between soap stints in the late 1980s. 

Brown replaced John Shearin as Roger Forbes on Loving during its early days, but was written out after only a couple of months. From 1986-1987, he played Charles Sanders, former ambassador to Mendorra, on One Life to Live. The character had a heart attack and died on the evening of his wedding to Lee Halpern. He subsequently played Blake Hayes on The Bold and the Beautiful, the ex-husband of Dr. Taylor Hamilton Hayes.

Personal life
Brown was married five times. His wives were:
Diane Jergens, an actress; they wed on September 6, 1958, in Las Vegas and divorced in June 1960.
Sandy Edmundson, a model; they wed on May 26, 1964, in Palos Verdes and divorced in 1969. They had a son.
Liliane Alice Yvette Safargy, a model; they wed on November 14, 1971, in Beverly Hills and divorced in September 1974.
Mary Kathleen Gauba, they wed on November 29, 1986, in Santa Fe and divorced in 1999.
Kerstin Kern; they wed on September 6, 2008, in Newbury Park, California.

Brown had three children as follows:

 Matthew, born 1965, by Sandy Edmudson
 Joshua, by Amber Karlson, with whom Brown lived from 1974 until 1979.
 Christi, by Merle Pertile.

Brown's brother, Phil, worked as an NBC Television West Coast operations coordinator in Burbank, California.

Filmography

Notes

References

External links

 Obituary - Hollywood Reporter

1935 births
2016 deaths
20th-century American male actors
21st-century American male actors
American male film actors
American male television actors
Deaths from Parkinson's disease
Male actors from Los Angeles
Male actors from New York City
Male Western (genre) film actors
Neurological disease deaths in Arizona
UCLA Film School alumni
Warner Bros. contract players
Western (genre) television actors